Wippermann jr GmbH is a roller chain manufacturer located in Hagen, Germany, and founded by Wilhelm Wippermann in 1893. They make the Connex brand of bicycle chains and master links. Their bicycle chains include such high-end features as nickel-plating, hollow pins, stainless steel, titanium rollers, and cutout plates. In 2008, Wippermann published wear test results in which their bicycle chains performed well. Wippermann chains are used by professional cyclists in the Tour de France.

See also
Other notable bicycle chain manufacturers include:
Campagnolo
Rohloff AG
TAYA Chain
KMC Chain
Shimano
SRAM

References

External links
Connex by Wippermann

Cycle parts manufacturers
Manufacturing companies of Germany